German submarine U-802 was a Type IXC/40 U-boat built for Nazi Germany's Kriegsmarine during World War II.

Design
German Type IXC/40 submarines were slightly larger than the original Type IXCs. U-802 had a displacement of  when at the surface and  while submerged. She had two shafts and two  propellers.

U-802 was fitted with six  torpedo tubes (four fitted at the bow and two at the stern), 22 torpedoes, one  SK C/32 naval gun, 180 rounds, and a  SK C/30 as well as a  C/30 anti-aircraft gun. The boat had a complement of forty-eight.

Service history
Laid down on 1 December 1941, U-802 was launched eleven months later on 31 October 1942. On 12 June 1943 the U-boat was commissioned  into service under the command of Kapitänleutnant Rolf Steinhaus (Crew 36).

In September 1943, Kapitänleutnant Helmut Schmoeckel (Crew 36) joined the crew of U-802 as a trainee commander. Schmoeckel finally relieved Steinhaus and took command of U-802 on 12 December 1943. Transferring from 4th U-boat Flotilla to 2nd U-boat Flotilla.

First patrol 
U-802 left base in Kiel on 29 January 1944 and after brief stops in Kristiansand and Stavanger she reached her assigned patrol area in the North Atlantic in mid-February. In an attack on convoy HX 286 she claimed two more steamers of 10,000 GRT sunk or damaged respectively. On 2 May 1944 the U-boat arrived in Lorient.

Second patrol 
U-802 set out from Lorient on her second patrol on 22 June 1944, but when her snorkel failed on 1 July, she made for port. After experiencing an air attack earlier that day, U-802 arrived back in Lorient on 9 July 1944.

Third patrol 
On 16 July the U-boat left again for operations in the West and North Atlantic. In mid-August U-802 made contact with an aircraft carrier but did not attack, but claimed an escort, sunk on 14 September 1944. However, this was proved incorrect; HMCS Stettler survived the war. On 12 November 1944, she returned to base via Norway to Flensburg.

Fourth patrol 
From Flensburg U-802 left again for the West Atlantic on 11 December 1944 to return to Kiel on 8 April 1945 after 118 days at sea. The last weeks of war in Europe U-802 spent in Norwegian waters.

Fate
Leaving Bergen on 3 May, U-802 arrived in Loch Eriboll on 11 May 1945 in order to surrender to the British. The U-boat was transferred to Loch Alsh the next day, and to Lisahally the day after that, where she remained until the end of the year.

Summary of raiding history

References

Bibliography

External links

World War II submarines of Germany
German Type IX submarines
1942 ships
U-boats commissioned in 1943
U-boats sunk in 1945
Ships built in Bremen (state)
Operation Deadlight
Maritime incidents in December 1945